Caytonia is an extinct genus of seed ferns.

Description 

Caytonia has berry like cupules with numerous small seeds arrayed along axes <ref name="Elgorriaga2019">{{cite journal |last1=Elgorriaga |first1=A. |last2=Escapa |first2=I. H. |last3=Cúneo |first3=R. |year=2019 |title=Southern Hemisphere Caytoniales: vegetative and reproductive remains from the Lonco Trapial Formation (Lower Jurassic), Patagonia. |journal= Journal of Systematic Palaeontology |volume=17 |issue=17 |pages=1477–1495 |doi= 10.1080/14772019.2018.1535456|s2cid=92287804 }}</ref>
	 
 Whole plant reconstructions 

Different organs attributed to the same original plant can be reconstructed from co-occurrence at the same locality and from similarities in the stomatal apparatus and other anatomical peculiarities of fossilized cuticles. Caytonia nathorstii may have been produced by the same plant as Caytonanthus arberi (pollen organs) and Sagenopteris phillipsii'' (leaves).

References 

Pteridospermatophyta
Jurassic plants
Prehistoric plant genera
Fossil record of plants
Jurassic genus first appearances
Jurassic extinctions